On Dangerous Ground is a 1917 American silent drama film directed by Robert Thornby and starring Carlyle Blackwell and Gail Kane. It was distributed by the World Film Company.

Plot
In the beginning of World War I before America was involved, Howard Thornton (Carlyle Blackwell) is a neutral American in Germany who watches his pal get drafted into the army. As he prepares to leave the county, he is surprised by a suitcase full of women's clothes appearing in his hotel room. It is soon followed by the woman herself, Louise  (Gail Kane), a spy trying to get a vial of secret papers to French authorities. She persuades Blackwell pose as her husband and help her smuggle the cache out.

Cast
 Carlyle Blackwell as Howard Barton
 Gail Kane as Louise
 Stanhope Wheatcroft as Hugo Grossman
 William Bailey as Ritter Boehm
 Frank Leigh as Trapadoux
 Florence Ashbrooke as Bertha
 John Burkell as Hans

Status
The film exists in the Library of Congress collection. A DVD was released by Edward Lorusso with an original music score by Lorusso in March 2018.

References

External links
 
 
 
 

1917 films
American silent feature films
Films directed by Robert Thornby
World Film Company films
American black-and-white films
Silent American drama films
1917 drama films
1910s American films